Mohamed Ben Guesmia (born 8 January 1973) is an Algerian former professional boxer who competed from 1997 to 2012. As an amateur, he competed in the men's light heavyweight event at the 1992 Summer Olympics.

References

External links
 

1973 births
Living people
Algerian male boxers
Olympic boxers of Algeria
Boxers at the 1992 Summer Olympics
Mediterranean Games silver medalists for Algeria
Competitors at the 1997 Mediterranean Games
People from Boufarik
Mediterranean Games medalists in boxing
Heavyweight boxers
Light-heavyweight boxers
Cruiserweight boxers
21st-century Algerian people
20th-century Algerian people